Mortari is a surname. Notable people with the surname include:

Cláudio Mortari (born 1948), Brazilian basketball player and coach
Daniele Mortari (born 1955), Italian (later naturalized American) engineer
Virgilio Mortari (1902–1993), Italian composer